Noon and Eternity is a studio album by experimental rock collective To Live and Shave in L.A. The album features production by Andrew W.K.

Background
Group leader Tom Smith commented on the making of the album: "We tracked the album in 2004 at Sonic Youth's studio in New York. Andrew WK played electronic drums. Thurston played guitar. Rat and Don Fleming played. Ben was there. I had to write the material in two days. My son came back from Iraq... He's fairly left leaning but he wanted a Hemingway adventure. I have a lot of love for my son, so a lot of those songs stemmed from revulsion to the Bush war machine. But tying something to a political moment can be suicidal for an artwork's longevity. So rather than making those political connotations overt, I made them universal. I made it about the love of my son, who had been changed by his experience."

Track listing
"This Home and Fear" – 24:25
"Early 1880s" – 19:23
"Percent Obstruct Street" – 13:09
"Mothers over Silverpoint" – 9:32

References

2006 albums